Kırşehir Province is located in central Turkey, forming part of the Central Anatolia Region. It stands on the North Anatolian Fault, and is currently in an earthquake warning zone. The average elevation is approximately 985 meters above sea level. The provincial capital is Kırşehir.

Kırşehir Province was originally established in 1924. On 30 June 1954, the provincial capital Kırşehir was demoted from a city to a district of Nevşehir Province by the ruling Democrat Party government of Prime Minister Adnan Menderes, because the majority of the city's residents had voted for the Republican Nation Party led by opposition politician Osman Bölükbaşı in the 1954 Turkish general election on 2 May 1954. The towns of present-day Kırşehir Province were divided between Ankara Province, Yozgat Province and Nevşehir Province. Three years later, on 1 July 1957, Kırşehir Province was re-established.

The provincial capital Kırşehir is the 69th largest city by population in Turkey; its surface area corresponds to 0.84% of Turkey's land area, which makes it the 53rd largest city in the country by land area.

Districts

Kırşehir province is divided into 7 districts (the capital district is in bold):
Akçakent
Akpınar
Boztepe
Çiçekdağı
Kaman
Kırşehir
Mucur

Places of Interest 
 Üçayak Byzantine Church
 Kilise Kalıntıları, "Church ruins" in Demirli, Kaman.

Gallery

See also
List of populated places in Kırşehir Province

References

External links

  Kırşehir governor's official website
  Kırşehir municipality's official website
  Kırşehir weather forecast information
 Kırşehir tourist information
 Kırşehir  information web pages
 Kırşehir  Haber